Miyani  is a beach Village in Porbandar Taluka in Porbandar District of Gujarat State, India.

Miyani Pin code is 360579 and postal head office is Bokhira . Nearby villages are Tukda Miyani ( 12 KM ) , Sakhpur ( 12 KM ) , Ambarama ( 13 KM ) , Sisli ( 13 KM ) , Visavada ( 14 KM ).

Miyani is located on a creek and an important fishing center and a fresh fish zone.

Miyani is located on coastline of Gujarat and has beautiful beaches. The village is also an important pilgrimage center for Hindus and Jains. As the are temples of Goddesses  Harsiddhi located here one ancient temple on hill-top of Koyla Dungar, mountain overlooking the sea. The present one which is located on foot-hill of mountain and where the deity is now worshiped said to be built by the Jain merchant Jagdusha in 13th century.

References

Villages in Porbandar district